Euchromius pygmaea is a moth in the family Crambidae. It was described by Hering in 1903. It is found on Sumatra.

References

Crambinae
Moths described in 1903
Moths of Asia